Barranquita District is one of eleven districts of the province Lamas in Peru. Barranquita is located in the Loreto Region of Peru at 5°10'0" south of the equator and 76°57'0" west of the Prime Meridian. The District Mayorship is held by Segundo Roger Reátegui Chumbe, a member of the Fuerza Communal political party.

References